Chris Kneifel (born April 23, 1961 in Chicago, Illinois), is a former driver in the CART Championship Car series. He raced in the 1982-1984 seasons with 19 career starts, including the 1983 and 1984 Indianapolis 500, and finished in the top ten 6 times. He was the last driver to start the Indianapolis 500 with a qualifying speed under . Kneifel, the next fastest car at just under , started in his place.

Earlier in his career, Kneifel raced in the Formula Ford and Formula Atlantic Series.  After CART, he was the 1985 Trans-Am Rookie of the Year.  Later he transitioned to American Le Mans Series endurance racing.  He capped his career by teaming with Ron Fellows, Frank Freon, and Johnny O'Connell to win the 2001 24 Hours of Daytona.  From 2001–2004, he served as the Chief Steward (Race Director) for CART.

Standing at 6 feet 6 inches (2 meters), Kneifel was one of the tallest racing drivers in IndyCar racing history.

Racing record

SCCA National Championship Runoffs

24 Hours of Le Mans results

External links
Official website

1961 births
Living people
Indianapolis 500 drivers
Champ Car drivers
Atlantic Championship drivers
Trans-Am Series drivers
24 Hours of Le Mans drivers
24 Hours of Daytona drivers
American Le Mans Series drivers
Racing drivers from Chicago
SCCA National Championship Runoffs participants

Corvette Racing drivers